Algeciras is a port city in the south of Spain.

Algeciras may also refer to:

In Spain
 The Bay of Algeciras, or Bay of Gibraltar, the area of sea to the north-west of the Gibraltar Strait
 The Port of Algeciras
 The Taifa of Algeciras, a medieval Muslim taifa kingdom in what is now southern Spain
 Algeciras CF, a Spanish football team
 Algeciras BM, a Spanish handball team

Other places
 Algeciras, Huila, Colombia
 Algeciras, a barangay in Agutaya municipality in Palawan, Philippines

Other uses
 Algeciras Conference, an international forum to decide the future of Morocco
 Operation Algeciras, a military operation of the Falklands War
 Battle of Algeciras Bay, in fact two battles that took place at the beginning of the nineteenth century
 Algeciras-class container ship, a class of container ships consisting of 12 vessels in total

See also
 Al Jazira